Tasyesat-e Kut-e Amir (also Romanized as Tāsyesāt-e Kūt-e Amīr; also known as Kūt-e Amīr) is a village in Kut-e Abdollah Rural District, in the Central District of Karun County, Khuzestan Province, Iran. At the 2006 census, its population was 851, in 161 families.

References 

Populated places in Karun County